American Yvette Company was a Chicago, Illinois based business that manufactured cosmetics and operated beauty shops. It thrived in the late 1920s and 1930s. The company ran hairdressing and beauty shops in thirty-seven leading department stores in thirty-four cities in the United States, in February 1929. It maintained exclusive rights to manufacture and sell Evera permanent wave machines in the United States and foreign countries. The firm is significant for being innovative during the Great Depression, especially in maintaining efficiency of production.

Earnings
At that time it exercised economies covering all phases of its operations, reducing costs by approximately 5%. Sales for January and February 1931 increased over the same months of 1930.  Profit increase for 1931 was estimated to grow to $3,500,000  from $3,369,952 in 1930.

In December 1929 American Yvette Company reported assets of $1,023,168 and liabilities of $155,438. During the economic upheaval the corporation lost $54,382 at the end of the fiscal year 1935, after expenses and depreciation. The previous year ending August 31, 1934, the net loss was slightly higher, totaling $62,469.

Merger
The American Yvette Company merged in July 1955 into the Yvette Delaware Corporation.

References

American Yvette Company
American Yvette Company
American Yvette Company